Wendy Williams Hunter ( Wendy Joan Williams; born July 18, 1964) is an American broadcaster, media personality, and writer. From 2008 to 2022, she hosted the nationally syndicated television talk show The Wendy Williams Show.

Prior to television, Williams was a radio DJ and host and quickly became known in New York as a shock jockette. She gained notoriety for her on-air spats with celebrities and was the subject of the 2006 VH1 reality television series The Wendy Williams Experience, which broadcast events surrounding her radio show.

Williams' other endeavors include authoring several books, appearances in various films and television shows, touring her comedy show, and her own product lines, including a fashion line, a jewelry collection and a wig line. Williams was inducted into the National Radio Hall of Fame in 2009. On her 50th birthday, the council of Asbury Park, New Jersey, renamed the street on which she grew up Wendy Williams Way.

Early life and education
Wendy Joan Williams was born on July 18, 1964, in Asbury Park, New Jersey. She is the second of three children born to Shirley and Thomas Dwayne Williams. The couple had a combined three master's degrees; Shirley was a special education teacher while Thomas was a teacher and school principal who in 1969 became the first black school administrator in Red Bank, New Jersey. Following 1970 race riots in Asbury Park, the family moved to the predominantly white, upper middle class suburb of Wayside in Ocean Township, New Jersey. They attended a Baptist church and visited the African American vacation town of Oak Bluffs, Massachusetts, each summer. As a child, doctors recommended Williams be medicated to control her hyperactivity. She suffered from poor body image due to the diet her parents put her on after gaining weight in elementary school. Williams was a Brownie in the Girl Scouts and volunteered as a candy striper. Her parents believed she would become a nurse.

Williams graduated from Ocean Township High School in 1982 among four black students, ranking 360th in the class of 363. Her academic performance opposed that of older sister Wanda who received a university scholarship at the age of 16. As she was able to use "white" diction instead of African-American Vernacular English, Williams's white classmates considered her one of their own and freely used the word nigger around her. She did not get along with the other black students and said their only commonality was smoking cannabis. According to Williams, she did not listen to hip hop music and instead listened to rock bands like AC/DC because they were popular with her classmates. She acted as an announcer at her younger brother Thomas's Little League Baseball games.

Williams attended Northeastern University in Boston with the intent of becoming a television anchor. Less than a month after starting, she switched from television communications to radio because she could advance her career faster—a move of which her parents disapproved. Williams graduated in 1986 with a Bachelor of Arts degree in communication and, to appease her parents, a minor in journalism. She was a disc jockey for the college radio station, WRBB, where rapper LL Cool J was her first celebrity interviewee. As an intern for Matt Siegel at contemporary hit radio station WXKS-FM, Williams recapped the soap operas Dallas and Dynasty on air.

Career

1986–1994: Career beginnings, WQHT, and WRKS
Two weeks after graduating from Northeastern, Williams began her career as a disc jockey working for the small, calypso and reggae-oriented WVIS in Frederiksted, U.S. Virgin Islands, but disliked the role because she did not learn as much about radio from her colleagues as she expected. Due to low pay and isolation from her family, Williams began sending resumes and demo tapes of herself to other radio stations. She left WVIS after eight months and obtained a position at Washington, D.C.'s WOL, but found its oldies radio format incompatible with her personality. Williams continued sending tapes to other stations and on November 1, 1987, began as a weekend fill-in on New York City's WQHT. After the urban contemporary station hired her full-time to work overnight shifts, she left WOL.

Williams was fired from WQHT after two years and briefly worked overnight shifts at WPLJ before being hired by WRKS. Initially working as a fill-in, WRKS gave Williams a non-compete clause and permanent morning position in May 1990 after WBLS began poaching its employees. She joined Jeff Foxx and Spider Webb as part of the station's "Wake-Up Club". There, Williams began gossiping about rappers and celebrities during a segment called "Dish the Dirt". Those she talked about, such as Bill Cosby and Russell Simmons, called the station and unsuccessfully demanded she be fired. As she grew into a popular radio personality, WRKS moved Williams to host the evening drive time slot in April 1991. By 1993, she was the highest-rated host in her time slot in the New York City market and received a Billboard Radio Award for R&B Major Market Radio Air Personality of the Year. Williams co-hosted American Urban Radio Networks' syndicated Top 30 USA song countdown program in 1993 and USA Music Magazine in 1994.

By mid-1994, WRKS had suffered a ratings decline amid competition from hip hop-oriented WQHT, which was owned by Emmis Broadcasting. In an effort to reverse the trend, WRKS moved Williams back to mornings on September 26, 1994, where she hosted a program titled "Wendy and Company". However, Emmis purchased WRKS less than three months later and transferred Williams to WQHT, where she began hosting the evening drive time slot on December 12, 1994. As WRKS was reformatted into an urban adult contemporary outlet geared toward older audiences, they believed Williams would better reflect WQHT's younger demographic.

1994–2009: Return to WQHT, WUSL, and WBLS

She was fired from Hot 97 in 1998. Williams was hired by a Philadelphia urban station, WUSL ("Power 99FM"). Her husband, Kevin Hunter, became her agent. She was very open about her personal life on air, discussing her miscarriages, breast enhancement surgery, and former drug addiction. She helped the station move from 14th place in the ratings to 2nd.

In 2001, Williams returned to the New York airwaves when WBLS hired her full-time for a syndicated 2–6 p.m. time slot. Williams' friend, MC Spice of Boston, offered his voiceover services to the show, often adding short rap verses tailored specifically for Williams' show. The New York Times stated that her "show works best when its elements – confessional paired with snarkiness – are conflated". By 2008, she was syndicated in Redondo Beach, California; Shreveport, Louisiana; Wilmington, Delaware; Toledo, Ohio; Columbia, South Carolina; Emporia, Virginia; Lake Charles, Louisiana; Tyler, Texas; and Alexandria, Louisiana, among other markets. Williams left her radio show in 2009 to focus on her television program and spend more time with her family.

2008–present: Television
In 2008, Debmar-Mercury offered Williams a six-week television trial of her own talk show. A syndicated daytime talk show hosted by Williams titled Wendy's World was poised to debut in fall 1997, but never aired. On July 14, 2008, Williams debuted her daytime talk show, The Wendy Williams Show, in four cities during the summer of 2008. During the tryout, The New York Times remarked that the show created a "breakthrough in daytime" by introducing the genre of the "backtalk show". After a successful run, Fox signed a deal with Debmar-Mercury to broadcast the show nationally on their stations beginning in July 2009. In addition, BET picked up cable rights to broadcast the show at night. In 2010, BET started airing the show internationally in 54 countries through BET International. The show attracted 2.4 million daily viewers on average, with Williams trading off daily with Ellen DeGeneres as the number one female host on daytime television.

Williams hosted a game show for GSN called Love Triangle (2011) for which she and her husband Kevin Hunter served as executive producers. Williams played a judge on the Lifetime network show Drop Dead Diva (2011) and served as a guest judge on The Face (2013). Williams was paired with Tony Dovolani as a contestant on the twelfth season of Dancing with the Stars; she was eliminated second. Williams later alleged the show's producers portrayed her as an angry black woman, a racial stereotype. Williams appeared in the film adaptation of Steve Harvey's book, Act Like a Lady, Think Like a Man, titled Think Like a Man (2012), and its sequel, Think Like a Man Too (2014). In 2012, it was announced Williams would enter into a "production alliance" with producers Suzanne de Passe and Madison Jones to create movies and television shows aimed at multicultural audiences. These projects will appear under the heading "Wendy Williams presents" and their first project will be VH1 adaptation of a Star Jones novel.

In February 2013, it was announced that Williams and her husband and manager, Kevin, were launching a reality television production company, Wendy Williams Productions. that will produce unscripted content, including reality television and game shows. Williams was an executive producer on the show Celebrities Undercover (2014). Williams also executive produced a biopic for Lifetime, Aaliyah: The Princess of R&B, which premiered on November 15, 2014. The film attracted controversy due to its casting and depiction of Aaliyah's relationship with R. Kelly. and received predominantly negative reviews from critics. In September 2015, the documentary series Death By Gossip with Wendy Williams premiered on the Investigation Discovery channel, both hosted and produced by Williams. In 2013, Williams was cast to play the role of Matron "Mama" Morton on the Broadway musical Chicago. She began her tenure on July 2 and finished her seven-week run on August 11, 2013. Her preparations for the musical were documented in the TV Guide docuseries Wendy Williams: How You Doin', Broadway?!, which was produced by her own production company, Wendy Williams Productions.

Williams had not missed an episode of her talk show until February 2018, when she took one week off; however, on February 21, 2018, Williams announced that her show would be on three weeks' hiatus due to her complications with Graves' disease and hyperthyroidism. In January 2019, a statement from the Williams Hunter family revealed that Williams had been hospitalized due to complications from Graves' disease and that her return to the show would be delayed indefinitely as a result. Guest hosts such as Nick Cannon filled in for Wendy during her absence; she returned on March 4, 2019. In early March 2020, the show discontinued its live audience for two tapings due to the coronavirus pandemic; Williams's staff filled in the seats. Shortly thereafter, production on the show was halted. The show reemerged as The Wendy Williams Show @ Home, broadcast through video chat from Williams's apartment, and continuing through May 15, when production was halted again due to a flare in Williams's Graves disease. In July 2020, Williams announced that her show would be returning to live broadcasting in-studio on September 21, 2020. In 2020, Williams competed on the fourth season of The Masked Singer as "Lips" where she was mostly sitting due to the weight of the costume. She performed the song "Native New Yorker" by Odyssey and was the first member of Group C to be eliminated and unmasked after her first appearance. Williams signed a deal with the US network Lifetime for a documentary, Wendy Williams: What a Mess! and a TV movie, Wendy Williams: The Movie based on her life.

Other ventures

Authorship
Williams is the author of three nonfiction books. She released an autobiography co-written with New York Daily News journalist Karen Hunter in August 2003 titled Wendy's Got the Heat. It focuses on her life, including childhood troubles, drug addiction, and marriages. Published by Atria, it debuted at number nine on The New York Times Best Seller list for nonfiction. The autobiography was reprinted in paperback in August 2004, a month before the debut of Williams' second book, The Wendy Williams Experience, which contains celebrity gossip and interviews. In May 2013, Williams released an advice book, Ask Wendy. Over the years, Williams wrote columns for Honey and Life & Style magazines.

Williams has also written several fiction books, including a trilogy about the life and career of radio shock jock Ritz Harper. She co-authored the first two novels, Drama Is Her Middle Name (2006) and Is the Bitch Dead, or What? (2007), with Hunter. Zondra Hughes co-wrote the third installment Ritz Harper Goes to Hollywood! (2009). Media outlets considered Ritz Harper similar to Williams. In 2014, Williams released a romance novel, Hold Me in Contempt. She said it was co-authored with an English professor ghostwriter.

Music and comedy 
Williams interviewed Blu Cantrell in 2003; the conversation was released as a DVD on the singer's album Bittersweet. Williams and Virgin Records released a compilation album, Wendy Williams Brings the Heat: Volume 1, in June 2005 featuring various rap acts, including M.O.P., Jadakiss, and Young Jeezy. It sold 29,000 copies by November of that year according to Nielsen SoundScan.

In 2014, Lipshtick called Williams to participate in their first all-female-based comedy series at the Venetian in Las Vegas. Williams made her sold-out comedy debut on July 11, 2014. Williams' comedy tour was called "The Sit-down Comedy Tour". Williams returned to Lipshtick on October 31, 2014, and November 1, 2014, after she made a sold-out debut in July. Williams hosted her "How You Laughin'" Comedy Series at NJPAC on November 15, 2014, featuring Luenell, Jonathan Martin, Pat Brown, Hadiyah Robinson, and Meme Simpson. In 2015, Williams announced a 12-city comedy tour called "The Wendy Williams Sit Down Tour: Too Real For Stand-Up."

Products and endorsements
While working for WRKS, Williams was a spokesperson for a hip-hop clothing brand. In 2006, she became a spokesperson for George Veselles champagne and Alizé liquers. Williams debuted a jewelry and shoe line on shopping channel QVC called "Adorn" in 2012. The shoe manufacturer's lawyer alleged she never paid the production cost. In 2013, Williams released a wig collection to online retailers. She sold a self-titled clothing line in 2015 on shopping channel HSN and continued the partnership the following year by releasing shoe and winter clothing collections.

Achievements 
City University of New York professor Tanisha C. Ford credits Williams for creating the format by which other personalities conduct gossip segments of their own. The scholars ThedaMarie Gibbs Grey and Bonnie J. Williams-Farrier contend Williams is among the African American women who, through their television programs, popularized the term "sipping tea". Williams's voice is a popular sound on the social media service TikTok; her quote "That's what she said, and you know what? I— what was that? ...OK ...James" is used in over 100,000 videos. Other phrases such as "Oh she passed away?" and mispronunciation of singer Dua Lipa's name as "Dula Peep" became internet memes. YouTube users uploaded compilation videos of various Williams-isms to the platform.

Williams was inducted into the National Radio Hall of Fame in 2009. On her 50th birthday in 2014, Asbury Park renamed the street on which she grew up Wendy Williams Way. She was honored with the 2,677th star on the Hollywood Walk of Fame on October 17, 2019. A wax figure of Williams is located at Madame Tussauds New York. In Washington, D.C., various artifacts related to Williams's career such as a microphone, outfit, and wig used by her are located at a television exhibit in the National Museum of American History. A documentary, Wendy Williams: What a Mess!, and a TV movie, Wendy Williams: The Movie, are based on her life.

Controversies and feuds
Williams has repeatedly feuded with celebrities and faced criticism for her comments. She has been mailed bullets and dead fish. Media outlets have described Williams's 2003 interview with Whitney Houston as her most infamous. After Williams asked Houston about her marriage and breast implants, they began a shouting match and Houston said she would have fought Williams if she were younger. In a later interview with Williams, Houston's confidant Robyn Crawford said they planned to confront her years earlier after she talked about Houston on air. Wu-Tang Clan performer Method Man had a personal and publicized conflict with Williams in 2006 after she revealed details about his wife's cancer diagnosis.

In 2014, Williams openly promoted sperm theft during a segment of her show titled Ask Wendy, in which an audience member claimed she wanted another child but her husband did not. When the audience member asked Williams if she should intentionally cease the use of birth control pills without informing her partner, Williams encouraged her to do so.

Williams was accused of victim blaming singer Kesha in 2016 after questioning why she did not film the alleged sexual abuse by record producer Dr. Luke against her. Williams later apologized for the remarks and explained "unfortunately a lot of people lie about rape so I was just being skeptical". In January 2018, Williams was criticized by activist Tarana Burke after saying an alleged 14-year-old victim of R. Kelly "let it go down" and that she was "sick of this Me Too movement".

Williams referred to Nicki Minaj's husband Kenneth Petty in 2019 as "a killer and a sex offender" (he was once imprisoned for attempted rape and manslaughter); the rapper responded by bringing up allegations of infidelity by Williams' own husband and said "I didn't know that in our society, you have to be plagued by your past."

In early 2020, Williams was criticized over several remarks she made on her show. In January, while talking about actor Joaquin Phoenix, Williams used her finger to pull up a part of her lip to resemble a cleft palate (a condition which Phoenix has denied having), which many took to believe she was mocking him. Williams apologized on her show. In February, Williams was criticized again for making comments many regarded as homophobic while talking about the fictional holiday "Galentine's Day"; she again apologized, this time in an emotional video posted to her official social channels online. Shortly thereafter, while talking about the death of Amie Harwick, Williams made a joke referring to Harwick's ex-fiancé Drew Carey and his job on The Price Is Right, saying that show's catchphrase, "Come on down!", in response to the news that Harwick had been thrown off a balcony.

Williams has had conflicts with others regarding parenting style. Actress Alyssa Milano criticized Williams' mentality regarding public breastfeeding after she said it made her uncomfortable because breasts are "more sexual than a feeding thing". Williams has been accused of transphobia. In one episode of her show, after stating that trans woman can never be assigned women, she told her audience, "Stop wearing our skirts and our heels!" After explicitly stating that to be a woman, one has to menstruate, she apologized for her remarks.

In 2021, Williams came under fire for her discussion of the murder of 19-year-old TikTok star Swavy, in which she compared her social media following to his, and commented about him, "I have no idea who this is. Neither does [producer] Norman [Baker]. Neither does one person in this building", before mentioning the circumstances of Swavy's death. Williams' comments were criticized as insensitive and disrespectful.

Personal life
Williams said she was date raped at college and by R&B singer Sherrick in the 1980s. In 1991, she had a six-week abortion after breaking up with her boyfriend. Williams later married her first husband, Bertrand "Bert" Girigorie. She refers to him under a pseudonym in her autobiography and says they separated after five months and divorced about eighteen months later. Williams met her second husband, Kevin Hunter, in 1994, and married him on November 30, 1999. She suffered multiple miscarriages before giving birth to their son, Kevin Samuel, on August 18, 2000. In April 2019, Williams filed for divorce due to irreconcilable differences after Hunter fathered a baby with a mistress. Although the divorce was finalized in January 2020, her legal surname remains Hunter.

Due to her suburban upbringing, Williams considers herself "a multicultural woman who happens to be Black". Williams identifies as Christian but no longer attends church services. She believes "God is everywhere" and prays "every day, several times a day". Williams is pro-choice for abortion. In 2012, she supported Barack Obama in that year's presidential election and promoted an NAACP voter helpline. That year, Williams posed for PETA's "I'd Rather Go Naked Than Wear Fur" campaign, stating "we should all try to be comfortable in our own skin and let the animals keep theirs." She supported the 2015 removal of the  Confederate battle flag from the South Carolina State House.

Health and appearance
Williams has had breast implants since 1994 and has had other cosmetic procedures such as liposuction and botox. Williams has been open about her cocaine addiction in the late 1980s and early 1990s, for which she never received treatment. Since fainting on her talk show in October 2017 due to dehydration, she has shared other health issues publicly. In February 2018, Williams disclosed that she has Graves' disease which causes hyperthyroidism, conditions she was diagnosed with nearly two decades prior. Due to the increased pressure behind her eyes, they sometimes have a pronounced appearance. Williams wears wigs in public because her thyroid condition thins her natural hair. She accidentally fractured her shoulder in December 2018.

In March 2019, Williams said she had been living in a sober house "for some time" and that she has vertigo. Later that year, Williams revealed she had been diagnosed with lymphedema, a condition that causes swelling in her ankles. During the COVID-19 pandemic in September 2021, Williams tested positive for a breakthrough infection of the disease. In early 2022, Williams's bank, Wells Fargo, froze her accounts and requested a New York Supreme Court hearing to determine whether her health conditions render her incapacitated and in need of a guardianship. Her attorney disputes these notions and says Williams employs "holistic health professionals".

Philanthropy
In 2005, Williams funded a $1,000 scholarship for a black female high school student who sought to major in communications at college. Subsequent recipients in 2006 and 2007 also received internships at WBLS. She led an effort to donate money and school supplies to Asbury Park Middle School in 2009. Williams and her husband created The Hunter Foundation in 2014, a non-profit organization that funded anti-poverty programs and provided resources to people as they transitioned from drug addiction to recovery. The foundation closed in May 2019 amid Williams's divorce. In September of that year, Williams became an ambassador and honorary board member of the Lymphatic Education & Research Network.

Accolades

Filmography

Film

Television

Bibliography

Nonfiction

Fiction

Notes

References

Works cited

External links

 The Wendy Williams Show 
 
 
 
 

1964 births
20th-century American actresses
20th-century American non-fiction writers
20th-century American women writers
21st-century American actresses
21st-century American non-fiction writers
21st-century American women writers
African-American Christians
African-American actresses
African-American game show hosts
African-American radio personalities
African-American television personalities
African-American television talk show hosts
African-American comedians
African-American writers
American autobiographers
American film actresses
American radio personalities
American television actresses
American television talk show hosts
American women non-fiction writers
American women television personalities
American women television presenters
Living people
Northeastern University alumni
Ocean Township High School alumni
People from Asbury Park, New Jersey
People from New Jersey
People from Ocean Township, Monmouth County, New Jersey
Female shock jocks
Women autobiographers
Writers from New Jersey
20th-century African-American women
21st-century African-American women writers
21st-century African-American writers
Comedians from New Jersey
African-American female comedians
American women comedians